Trust was a French hard rock band founded in 1977 and popular in Europe in the first half of the 1980s. The band is best known for guitarist Norbert "Nono" Krief's prowess, for Bernard "Bernie" Bonvoisin's voice reminiscent of AC/DC's Bon Scott and for his lyrics about social and political themes. Iron Maiden's drummers Nicko McBrain and Clive Burr were part of Trust line-up in the 1980s. The band disbanded in 1985 and reformed in the 2000s for live shows and new recordings.

History
Trust was founded in 1977 by Bernard "Bernie" Bonvoisin (vocals, lyricist), Norbert "Nono" Krief (guitar, composer), Raymond "Ray" Manna (bass) and Jean-Émile "Jeannot" Hanela (drums). The band released its first single "Prends Pas Ton Flingue" ("Don't Take Your Gun with You") in the same year. This record was re-released when the band made its first short-lived comeback in 1992.

Trust rose to fame in 1979 and 1980 with their music, which mixed hard rock influences, acerbic social and political commentary, anarchist undertones and a renegade attitude à la MC5. Trust's success was also due to Krief's stature as a French guitar hero and Bonvoisin's sincere and mature lyrics, as well as his raw energy in live performances. Their 1980 hit song "Antisocial" from the album Répression criticized the frenetic, dehumanizing pace of modern life and work in large cities. "Le Mitard" of the same album attacked what Trust claimed was an excessively repressive handling of juvenile delinquency, featuring texts from public enemy number one Jacques Mesrine and the song "Monsieur Comédie" criticizes Ayatollah Khomeini, who was in exile in France at the time, depicting him as a "torturer". To translate the songs' aggressive political messages Trust were helped on English lyrics for the Répression album by Jimmy Pursey of British punk band Sham 69. The English adaptation of the song "Antisocial" however is pretty rough and mild compared to the original lyrics. While the first four lines in the french version translate to "You spend a lifetime working to pay for your own tombstone, You hide your face behind the newspaper, You walk like a robot in the subway corridors, Nobody cares about your presence, It's up to you to make the first step", the English version reads "You're a train ride to no importance, You're in love with hell existence, Money is all that you desire, Why don't you pack it in and retire".

Other major political songs includes "Darquier" (7" Single, 1979) commenting on notorious Nazi Germany collaborator Louis Darquier de Pellepoix, "Les Brutes" (from the 1981 album Marche Ou Crève) describes the savage acts done by the Warsaw Pact military forces at the Prague Spring in Czechoslovakia, "H & D" (from the 1979 album L'Élite), with "H & D" standing for "Hôpital & Débiles" ("Asylum & Psychos"), accuses the Soviet Union and its secret services (KGB) of suppressing dissent by sending political opponents to psychiatric hospitals under fake diagnoses. 

The style of singer Bernie Bonvoisin was compared to that of Bon Scott from AC/DC, with whom Trust had a friendly relationship. "Ride On" by Bon Scott's AC/DC was covered in Trust's '79 debut album. 1980's Répression dans l'Hexagone (Repression in the Hexagon) live album, featured the covers of the AC/DC songs "Problem Child" and "Live Wire". The live album was released as Trust Live twelve years after its recording by Sony Music France to coincide with AC/DC's Live album release in France. However, the band members denied using such a marketing strategy, claiming the masters they thought were lost had been found the same year by coincidence.

From 1983 onwards, the band came under increasing criticism for its less "incisive" sound and the frequent changes of drummers (e.g. Nicko McBrain quit the band after Savage to join Iron Maiden).

Trust disbanded in 1985, but Bonvoisin and Krief later re-formed occasionally for records and concerts, eventually "compromising" their typical hard rock sound with 2000s French rap acts including Suprême NTM.

The English version of the band's most successful song "Antisocial" was covered by Anthrax on their 1988 State of Euphoria album and became one of their most popular songs and videos. A year later Anthrax also recorded the French version of the song which is featured on their 1989 EP Penikufesin). A live version of the 12" single for Anthraxs' song "Make Me Laugh" features Bernie Bonvoisin on vocals together with Anthrax singer Joey Belladonna.

In early July 2008, Trust's original line-up reformed to perform a 1979 to 1986 best of gig at the Festival des Terres Neuvas. In September 2008, a new album, 13 à table (Thirteen at the Table) was released.

In 2012, Bonvoisin stated that there will be no Trust reunification and also no remastered albums. However, later in the year the band was added to the Sonisphere France line-up.

Discography

Albums
 1977 Prends Pas Ton Flingue / Paris By Night [SP] France
 1979 Trust I (L'Élite) France, United Kingdom, United States, Netherlands, Japan CBS 83732
 1980 Répression France, Germany PFC 90610 CBS
 1980 Repression (English version of Répression) United Kingdom, United States, Netherlands, Japan, Canada S CBS 84958
 1981 Marche Ou Crève France, Germany, Italy EPIC EPC 85238 (with Nicko McBrain on drums)
 1982 Savage (English version of Marche Ou Crève) United Kingdom, United States, Spain, Netherlands, Portugal, Japan (with Nicko McBrain on drums)
 1983 Trust IV (Idéal) France, Germany EPC 25666 (with Clive Burr on drums)
 1984 Man's Trap (English version of Trust IV) United Kingdom, United States, Japan, Netherlands (with Clive Burr on drums)
 1984 Rock'n'Roll France, Canada
 1988 En attendant... [EP] France, United Kingdom, United States
 1992 Prends pas ton flingue [EP] France
 1993 The Back Sides [EP] France EPC 473916-2
 1996 Europe et Haines France Wea 0630-16712-2
 2000 Ni Dieu Ni Maître France XIIIBIS Records 526 291 PM 125
 2008 13 à table France Universal Mercury 5311096
 2018 Dans Le Même Sang 
 2019 Fils de lutte
 2022 Propaganda

Live albums
 1988 Live: Paris By Night (recorded at Bercy Sep 24/25,1988 on the Monsters of Rock tour with Iron Maiden, Anthrax, and Helloween) France, United States {see French Wikipedia entry }
 1992 Répression dans l'Hexagone (Live) (Répression dans l'Hexagone 1980 tour) France
 1997 A Live Tour 97 (Insurrection dans l'Hexagone tour) France
 2000 Still A-live (German edition of A Live Tour 97, contains a bonus 6-track EP) Germany
 2006 Soulagez-vous dans les urnes! (2006 tour, contains 3 new studio tracks) France
 2009 A L'Olympia (2008 tour, Rockpalast 1982 gig added in the limited CD + DVD edition)France
 2017 Hellfest 2017 : Au nom de la rage tour (recorded during the Hellfest) France

Compilation albums
 1981 Heavy Metal Soundtrack - Includes a version of "Prefabricated".
 1997 Anti Best of France, Germany
 2001 Les Indispensables De Trust (Original versions) France
 2002 Les Plus Belles Chansons (Canadian edition of "Les Indispensables", original versions) Canada
 2004 Le Meilleur Des Années CBS (Original versions) France

Boxed sets
 1997 Trust I / Repression France, United States
 2008 "Les Annees CBS", EU (11CD Boxset)

Tribute
 2001 Tribute to Trust [VA] France

References

External links
 Official forum (in French)
 A comprehensive article about Trust in German online fanzine "zine with no name" (in German)

French heavy metal musical groups
French hard rock musical groups
Musical groups established in 1977
Musical groups disestablished in 1985
Musical groups reestablished in 1988
Musical groups disestablished in 1988
Musical groups reestablished in 1996
Musical groups disestablished in 2000
Musical groups reestablished in 2006
Musical groups disestablished in 2006
Musical groups from Paris